SkiStar AB (marketed as skistar) is a Swedish leisure, tourism, property and retail company, listed on the Stockholm Stock Exchange. The core business is alpine skiing in Sweden and Norway, and the associated accommodation, ski schools and rental services.

Overview 
The company has property development and management divisions, for example it is part-owner of Scandinavian Mountains Airport in Dalarna. The company also supplies ski infrastructure to other operators, for example it installed the ski lifts at Nätschen, Switzerland.

Skistar operates SkiStarshop Concept Store, a chain of retail outlets selling mainly winter sport-related clothing and equipment, and an associated online shop skistarshop.com.

From its foundation in 1975 until 2001 the company was called Sälenstjärnan AB.

List of ski resorts 
 Sälen, Dalarna, Sweden (head office)
 Lindvallen, Högfjället, Tandådalen and Hundfjället
 Vemdalen, Jämtland, Sweden
 Björnrike, Vemdalsskalet and Klövsjö/Storhogna
 Åre, Jämtland, Sweden
 Duved, Åre By and Björnen
 Trysil, Hedmark, Norway
 Høgegga, Skihytta, Trysil Turistsenter and Trysil Høyfjellssenter
 Hemsedal, Buskerud, Norway
 Hammarbybacken, Stockholm, Sweden
 St. Johann in Tirol, Austria

Subsidiaries 
SkiStar has several subsidiary companies, including:
 Fjällinvest AB, wholly owned Swedish property development company
 Fjellinvest Norge AS, wholly owned Norwegian property development company
 Sälens Högfjällshotell AB
 Tandådalens Fjällhotell Service AB
 Åre Invest AB

References

Travel and holiday companies of Sweden
Alpine skiing in Norway
Alpine skiing in Sweden
Swedish companies established in 1975
Hospitality companies established in 1975
Companies listed on Nasdaq Stockholm
Hospitality companies of Europe
Ski areas and resorts in Sweden
Skiing organizations
Companies based in Dalarna County
Tourist attractions in Dalarna County
Real estate companies of Sweden
Property management companies
Shopping center management firms
Online retailers of Sweden
Clothing retailers of Sweden
Sporting goods retailers